Jeffrey Lau Chun-Wai (born 5 February 1955) is a Hong Kong film director, screenwriter, actor and producer. Lau is famous for writing and directing "mo lei tau" comedies.  His comedies include A Chinese Odyssey (with Stephen Chow) and Chinese Odyssey 2002, the latter which was voted Best 2002 Film by the Hong Kong Film Critics Society.

Filmography
Nomad (1982)
My Darling, My Goddess (1982)
Coolie Killer (1982)
Yellow Peril (1984)
Hong Kong Butcher (1985)
Operation Pink Squad (1986)
The Haunted Cop Shop (1987)
Eastern Condors (1987)
Flaming Brothers (1987)
Operation Pink Squad II (1987)
Carry on Hotel (1988)
The Haunted Cop Shop II (1988)
Thunder Cops II (1989)
All for the Winner (1990)
Mortuary Blues (1990)
The Top Bet (1991)
The Top Bell (1991)
Fist of Fury 1991 (1991)
Lethal Contact (1991)
Today's Hero (1991)
92 Legendary La Rose Noire (1992)
Rose Rose I Love You (1993)
The Eagle Shooting Heroes (1993)
The Bride with White Hair (1993)
A Chinese Odyssey Part One: Pandora's Box (1994)
Ashes of Time (1994)
Treasure Hunt (1994)
Love and the City (1994)
A Chinese Odyssey Part Two: Cinderella (1994)
Out of the Dark (1995)
Fallen Angels (1995)
Mahjong Dragon (1996)
Black Rose II (1997)
Timeless Romance (1998)
Chinese Odyssey 2002 (2002)
Second Time Around (2002)
Kung Fu Hustle (2004)
A Chinese Tall Story (2005)
Kungfu Cyborg: Metallic Attraction (2009)
Just Another Pandora's Box (2010)
The Fantastic Water Babes (2010)
East Meets West 2011 (2011)
Just Another Margin (2014)
Lock Me Up, Tie Him Down (2014)
A Chinese Odyssey Part Three (2016)
Soccer Killer (2017)
Kung Fu League (2018)

External links
 

1952 births
Living people
Hong Kong male film actors
Hong Kong film directors
Hong Kong film producers
Hong Kong screenwriters
Hong Kong male television actors